Centrolene is a genus of glass frogs in the family Centrolenidae. The adult males are characterized by having a humeral spine, as most members of this family. The delimitation of this genus versus Cochranella is not fully resolved, and some species formerly in Centrolenella — which is nowadays synonymized with Centrolene — are now in Hyalinobatrachium.

The genus is known as "giant glass frogs". But this is merely relative to the rest of their family, which contains numerous extremely diminutive species.

Species
The following species are recognised in the genus Centrolene:

References

 
Glass frogs
Amphibians of South America
Taxa named by Marcos Jiménez de la Espada
Amphibian genera